John Kenneth Ousterhout (born October 15, 1954) is a professor of computer science at Stanford University. He founded Electric Cloud with John Graham-Cumming. Ousterhout was a professor of computer science at University of California, Berkeley where he created the Tcl scripting language and the Tk platform-independent widget toolkit, and proposed the idea of coscheduling. Ousterhout led the research group that designed the experimental Sprite operating system and the first log-structured file system.
Ousterhout also led the team that developed the Magic VLSI computer-aided design (CAD) program.

He received his bachelor's degree in physics from Yale University in 1975, and his Ph.D. in computer science from Carnegie Mellon University in 1980.

Ousterhout received the Grace Murray Hopper Award in 1987 for his work on Electronic design automation CAD systems for very-large-scale integrated circuits.  For the same work, he was inducted in 1994 as a Fellow of the Association for Computing Machinery. Ousterhout was elected a member of the National Academy of Engineering in 2001 for improving our ability to program computers by raising the level of abstraction.

In 1994, Ousterhout left Berkeley to join Sun Microsystems Laboratories, which hired a team to join him in Tcl development. After several years at Sun, he left and co-founded Scriptics, Inc. (later renamed Ajuba Solutions) in January 1998 to provide professional Tcl development tools. Most of the Tcl team followed him from Sun. Ajuba was purchased by Interwoven in October 2000. He joined the faculty of Stanford University in 2008.

Selected works

 A Philosophy of Software Design, (Yaknyam Press, 2018)

See also
 Ousterhout's dichotomy
 Raft (computer science)

References

External links
 John's recounting of Tcl's early days
 Ousterhout's web page at Stanford University

Computer programmers
Stanford University School of Engineering faculty
University of California, Berkeley faculty
Fellows of the Association for Computing Machinery
Carnegie Mellon University alumni
Grace Murray Hopper Award laureates
Yale University alumni
Living people
1954 births
Programming language designers
Place of birth missing (living people)
American computer scientists
Members of the United States National Academy of Engineering
Sun Microsystems people